The Cutler River is a stream located in the White Mountains of New Hampshire in the United States.

Approximately  in length, it is a tributary of the Ellis River – ]a part of the Saco River watershed flowing to the Atlantic Ocean in Maine.

The river rises as two branches on the eastern slopes of Mount Washington, the highest peak in the northeastern United States. The western branch, identified as the main stem by some sources, begins in Tuckerman Ravine. The northern branch, shown as the main stem by the U.S. Geological Survey, flows out of Huntington Ravine.

See also

List of rivers of New Hampshire

References

Rivers of Coös County, New Hampshire
Mount Washington (New Hampshire)
Rivers of New Hampshire
Saco River